Willie Edward Knighton Jr. (born March 13, 1972), better known as Khujo, is an American rapper. He is one-fourth of Goodie Mob (along with T-Mo, Cee-Lo, and Big Gipp), and one-half of The Lumberjacks (with T-Mo).

Life and career
Khujo was born in Atlanta, Georgia. He is the only featured guest to appear on every single Outkast album, including Big Boi's solo album. Khujo has released a new book titled "Straight out the A" that focuses on his life and the development of the Dirty South movement from OutKast to Goodie Mob. Khujo is a very spiritual man known for his distinct, grunty voice and free-flowing rhyming style. He rhymes about all aspects of street life, often intertwining those subject with God metaphorically or directly. In June 2002, he was involved in a car crash that resulted in the amputation of his right leg below the knee.

He released his debut solo album, The Man Not the Dawg, in 2002.

Discography

With Goodie Mob 
Soul Food (1995), LaFace Records
Still Standing (1998), LaFace Records
World Party (1999), LaFace Records
One Monkey Don't Stop No Show (2004), Koch
Age Against the Machine (2013), The Right Records

With The Lumberjacks
Livin' Life as Lumberjacks (2005), Koch
A.T.L. 2 (A-Town Legends 2) (The Lumberjacks & Pastor Troy) (2008) Siccness Records/ Flix

With Willie Isz
Georgiavania (2009), Lex

Solo
The Man Not the Dawg (2002), Street Level
Mercury (2007), Day One Music
G-Mob Godfather (2009)
Echoes of a Legend (2020)

References

Rappers from Atlanta
Dungeon Family members
African-American male rappers
Southern hip hop musicians
Living people
1972 births
Goodie Mob members
American amputees
Arista Records artists
21st-century American rappers
Lumberjacks (group) members